Dopamine: My Life on My Back is the first EP by Jesse Boykins III, released in 2008.

Track listing
All songs written, produced, engineered, and mixed by Jesse Boykins III.

 "My Life on My Back ft. J.A.M.E.S Watts" – 0:54
 "Tabloids" – 4:25
 "Sounds Like Love" – 0:22
 "Baby I Don't Know" – 3:50
 "The Sea" – 2:53
 "Sobriety" – 4:02
 "Think" – 3:48
 "All (Outro)" – 3:31

Personnel 
J. Boykins III - keyboard, drums program
J. Most - guitar, bass
Earl Travis - bass
Jamire Williams - drum
Marion Ross III - trumpet, keyboard, beatbox
Daniel - keyboard
Anthony Coleman II - trumpet
Justin Brown - drums
Devry Pugh - rhodes
Warren Fields - piano
Steve Wyreman - guitar

Technical personnel 
Mastered by Ron Schaffer
Jay Woo Design – art design
J. Shotti, Nicky Woo – photography
All music recorded at NSU Studios

References

Jesse Boykins III albums
2008 EPs